Hwaseong or Hwasong can refer to:

Hwaseong, Gyeonggi, a city in the South Korean province of Gyeonggi
Hwaseong Stadium, a group of sports facilities
Hwaseong Fortress, a UNESCO heritage site in Suwon City, Gyeonggi Province, South Korea
Hwasŏng (North Korea), a county in North Hamgyong province, North Korea, now known as Myonggan County
Hwasong concentration camp, a political prison camp in North Hamgyong province, North Korea
Hwasong rocket family
Hwasong-1 (R-17 Elbrus)
Hwasong-3 (9K52 Luna-M / 2K6 Luna)
Hwasong-5, North Korean version of the Scud ballistic missile
Hwasong-6, also a North Korean version of the Scud ballistic missile
Hwasong-7 (Rodong-1)
Hwasong-9 (Rodong-1M)
Hwasong-10
Hwasong-11 (KN-02 Toksa)
Hwasong-12
Hwasong-13 (KN-08)
Hwasong-14, July 2017 version of the North Korean ICBM
Hwasong-15
Hwasong-17

es:Hwaseong